Karataş (Mègarsos) is a small city and a district in Adana Province, on the Mediterranean coast of Turkey, 47 km from the city of Adana, between the rivers of Seyhan and Ceyhan, the Pyramos of Antiquity. The city of Karataş has a population of 10,293 (at the end of 2022), with another 13,206 living in surrounding villages within the district.

History

The area has been inhabited from at least Hittite times and probably earlier. It was later part of the Assyrian province of Quwê (Que).  By the time of the Greeks, who knew the city as Megarsos/Magarso, there was a port here at the mouth of the navigable Pyramos, supplying an important military and trading route into the plain of Cilicia, and also providing access to the sea for the river towns, like Mallus.  In 333 BCE, just before the battle of Issus, Alexander the Great sacrificed here at a temple that, by interpretatio graeca, he took to be of Athena; the "Athena of Magarsos" who appears on Hellenistic coins has been diagnosed, from her pose and the attributes that surround her, to have Mesopotamian connections. Robin Lane Fox recognizes the origin of the cult site in the victories of Sennacherib, who instituted the shrine in 696 BCE following a sea battle with Greeks off the mouth of the river; he dedicated it to his martial goddess, Anat, or Ishtar.

The Romans rendered Magarsos as Megarsus.  The port was later conquered by the Arab armies during the growth of Islam and then by the Ottomans in 1517.

Karataş was occupied by French troops during World War I.

Places of interest
The ruins of churches, caravanserai, and an amphitheatre. However the ancient monuments remain to date in lack of proper research or preservation.
The inlet of Akyatan is a breeding ground for many birds and the sea turtle species Chelonia mydas and Caretta caretta. Karataş is particularly important for the latter, which is an endangered species that lays eggs primarily in Akyatan, another beach in neighboring Yumurtalık district and İztuzu Beach in Dalyan in southwestern Turkey.

Karataş today
Today Karataş is known for its fishing industry and as a place that Adana's inhabitants can easily access to relax on the beach. There are also rich farmlands behind the coast where cotton, watermelons, melons and other crops are grown.

The well-known footballer Hasan Şaş is from Karataş and has a street named after him in memory of his excellent performance for Turkey national football team during the 2002 World Cup.

Brussels-based painter Nazife Can is also from Karataş.

References

Hazlitt, Classical Gazetteer, "Megarsus"

External links

 District governorate's official website 

 
Çukurova
Cities in Turkey
Populated coastal places in Turkey
Mediterranean port cities and towns in Turkey
Populated places in Adana Province
Tourist attractions in Adana Province
Fishing communities in Turkey
Districts of Adana Province